Westport is a city in Pope County, Minnesota, United States. The population was 57 at the 2010 census.

History
Westport was platted in 1882. A post office called Westport was established in 1888, and remained in operation until 1966.

Geography

Minnesota State Highway 28 serves as a main route in the community.

Demographics

2010 census
As of the census of 2010, there were 57 people, 22 households, and 13 families living in the city. The racial makeup of the city was 80.7% White, 3.5% African American, and 15.8% from other races. Hispanic or Latino of any race were 15.8% of the population.

There were 22 households, of which 36.4% had children under the age of 18 living with them, 50.0% were married couples living together, 4.5% had a female householder with no husband present, 4.5% had a male householder with no wife present, and 40.9% were non-families. 36.4% of all households were made up of individuals, and 9% had someone living alone who was 65 years of age or older. The average household size was 2.59 and the average family size was 3.31.

The median age in the city was 39.8 years. 29.8% of residents were under the age of 18; 0% were between the ages of 18 and 24; 31.6% were from 25 to 44; 31.6% were from 45 to 64; and 7% were 65 years of age or older. The gender makeup of the city was 54.4% male and 45.6% female.

2000 census
As of the census of 2000, there were 72 people, 23 households, and 18 families living in the city. The racial makeup of the city was 100.00% White.

There were 23 households, out of which 47.8% had children under the age of 18 living with them, 60.9% were married couples living together, 4.3% had a female householder with no husband present, and 17.4% were non-families. 17.4% of all households were made up of individuals, and 8.7% had someone living alone who was 65 years of age or older. The average household size was 3.13 and the average family size was 3.21.

In the city, the population was spread out, with 31.9% under the age of 18, 15.3% from 18 to 24, 26.4% from 25 to 44, 13.9% from 45 to 64, and 12.5% who were 65 years of age or older. The median age was 29 years. For every 100 females, there were 80.0 males. For every 100 females age 18 and over, there were 81.5 males.

The median income for a household in the city was $38,438, and the median income for a family was $38,750. Males had a median income of $22,188 versus $19,688 for females. The per capita income for the city was $14,501. There were no families and 4.3% of the population living below the poverty line, including no under eighteens and 33.3% of those over 64.

References

Cities in Pope County, Minnesota
Cities in Minnesota